= Stack (board game) =

1986 board game

Stack is a board game published in 1986 by BB Games.

== Contents ==
Stack is a game in which the object is for a player to get one of their pieces on to the opponent's back row and keep it there one more turn.

== Reception ==
Eric Solomon reviewed Stack for Games International magazine, and gave it 4 stars out of 5, and stated that "I would recommend Stack as the best two-player game of its type which I have seen."
